El Cuartito is a pizza restaurant in Buenos Aires, Argentina founded in September 1934. It is located on Talcahuano 937. El Cuartito's slogan is "The Good Pizza". It has been declared cultural heritage of Buenos Aires. El Cuartito is one of the oldest pizza restaurants in Buenos Aires. The restaurant also specializes in empanadas.

References

Further reading
 Fodor's Buenos Aires – Fodor's Travel Publications, Inc., Sorrel Moseley-Williams, Victoria Patience. p. 198.
 A Hedonist's Guide to Buenos Aires – Charles Froggatt. p. 124.
  Pizzerias de Valor Patrimonial de Buenos Aires. pp. 57–61.

External links 
 
  Web oficial de El Cuartito (archived version)

1934 establishments in Argentina
Pizzerias in Buenos Aires
Restaurants established in 1934